The coefficient of performance or COP (sometimes CP or CoP) of a heat pump, refrigerator or air conditioning system is a ratio of useful heating or cooling provided to work (energy) required. Higher COPs equate to higher efficiency, lower energy (power) consumption and thus lower operating costs. 

The COP usually exceeds 1, especially in heat pumps, because, instead of just converting work to heat (which, if 100% efficient, would be a COP of 1), it pumps additional heat from a heat source to where the heat is required. Most air conditioners have a COP of 2.3 to 3.5. Less work is required to move heat than for conversion into heat, and because of this, heat pumps, air conditioners and refrigeration systems can have a coefficient of performance greater than one. 

However, this does not mean that they are more than 100% efficient, in other words, no heat engine can have a thermal efficiency of 100% or greater. For complete systems, COP calculations should include energy consumption of all power consuming auxiliaries. The COP is highly dependent on operating conditions, especially absolute temperature and relative temperature between sink and system, and is often graphed or averaged against expected conditions. 

Performance of absorption refrigerator chillers is typically much lower, as they are not heat pumps relying on compression, but instead rely on chemical reactions driven by heat.

Equation 
The equation is:

where
  is the useful heat supplied or removed by the considered system (machine).
  is the net work put into the considered system in one cycle.

The COP for heating and cooling are different because the heat reservoir of interest is different. When one is interested in how well a machine cools, the COP is the ratio of the heat taken up from the cold reservoir to input work. However, for heating, the COP is the ratio of the magnitude of the heat given off to the hot reservoir (which is the heat taken up from the cold reservoir plus the input work) to the input work:

where
 is the heat removed from the cold reservoir and added to the system;
 is the heat given off to the hot reservoir; it is lost by the system and therefore negative (see heat).

Note that the COP of a heat pump depends on its direction. The heat rejected to the hot sink is greater than the heat absorbed from the cold source, so the heating COP is greater by one than the cooling COP.

Theoretical performance limits
According to the first law of thermodynamics, after a full cycle of the process  and thus .
Since , we obtain

For a heat pump operating at maximum theoretical efficiency (i.e. Carnot efficiency), it can be shown that 
   and thus   

At maximum theoretical efficiency, therefore

which is equal to the reciprocal of the thermal efficiency of an ideal heat engine, because a heat pump is a heat engine operating in reverse.

Similarly, the COP of a refrigerator or air conditioner operating at maximum theoretical efficiency,

 applies to heat pumps and  applies to air conditioners and refrigerators. 
Measured values for actual systems will always be significantly less than these theoretical maxima.
 
According to the above formula, the maximum theoretical COPs would be  

Test results of the best systems are around 4.5. When measuring installed units over a whole season and accounting for the energy needed to pump water through the piping systems, seasonal COP's for heating are around 3.5 or less. This indicates room for further improvement.
 

Given sub-zero European winter temperatures, real world heating performance is significantly poorer than such standard COP figures imply.

Improving the COP
As the formula shows, the COP of a heat pump system can be improved by reducing the temperature gap  minus  at which the system works. Accurately determining thermal conductivity will allow for much more precise ground loop  or borehole sizing, resulting in higher return temperatures and a more efficient system. For an air cooler, the COP could be improved by using ground water as an input instead of air, and by reducing the temperature drop on the output side by increasing the air flow. For both systems, also increasing the size of pipes and air canals would help to reduce noise and the energy consumption of pumps (and ventilators) by decreasing the speed of the fluid, which in turn lowers the Reynolds number and hence the turbulence (and noise) and the head loss (see hydraulic head). The heat pump itself can be improved by increasing the size of the internal heat exchangers, which in turn increases the efficiency (and the cost) relative to the power of the compressor, and also by reducing the system's internal temperature gap over the compressor. Obviously, this latter measure makes such heat pumps unsuitable to produce high temperatures, which means that a separate machine is needed for producing, e.g., hot tap water.

The COP of absorption chillers can be improved by adding a second or third stage. Double and triple effect chillers are significantly more efficient than single effect chillers, and can surpass a COP of 1. They require higher pressure and higher temperature steam, but this is still a relatively small 10 pounds of steam per hour per ton of cooling.

Seasonal efficiency 
A realistic indication of energy efficiency over an entire year can be achieved by using seasonal COP or seasonal coefficient of performance (SCOP) for heat. Seasonal energy efficiency ratio (SEER) is mostly used for air conditioning. SCOP is a new methodology that gives a better indication of expected real-life performance, using COP can be considered using the "old" scale. Seasonal efficiency gives an indication on how efficiently a heat pump operates over an entire cooling or heating season.

See also
 Seasonal energy efficiency ratio (SEER)
 Seasonal thermal energy storage (STES)
 Heating seasonal performance factor (HSPF)
 Power usage effectiveness (PUE)
 Thermal efficiency
 Vapor-compression refrigeration
 Air conditioner
 HVAC

Notes

External links 
Discussion on changes to COP of a heat pump depending on input and output temperatures
See COP definition in Cap XII of the book Industrial Energy Management - Principles and Applications

Heat pumps
Heating, ventilation, and air conditioning
Dimensionless numbers of thermodynamics
Engineering ratios